Peignot may refer to:

People 
 Gabriel Peignot (1767–1849), French bibliographer
 Georges Peignot (1872–1915), typographer and director of the foundry G. Peignot et Fils 
 Charles Peignot (1897–1984), founder of Arts et métiers graphiques review, co-founder of professional organisation ATypI, director of the foundry Deberny & Peignot
 Colette Peignot (1903–1938), French author, also known as Laure
 Jérôme Peignot (born 1926), French novelist, poet, pamphleteer, and expert in typography
 Jo Peignot (1901–1969), French actor

Industry 
 Peignot (typeface), typeface designed by Cassandre
 Prix Charles Peignot, award in typeface design
 G. Peignot et Fils, French type foundry (1898–1919)
 Deberny & Peignot, French type foundry (1923–1972)

es:Peignot
fr:Peignot (police d'écriture)